Mook or Mooks may refer to:

Places
 Mook, Iran (disambiguation)
 Mook, Kentucky, an unincorporated community, United States
 Mook en Middelaar, a municipality in the Netherlands

Entertainment
 Mook (publishing), a portmanteau of magazine and book
 Mook Animation, a Japanese animation studio
 Mook, a playable character race in the Wizardry RPG series
 The Mooks, a gang in the City of Heroes MMORPG
 Mook (gaming), often synonymous with "mob", but generally used to refer to enemies specifically opposed to the player

People 
 Anne Lamy Mook (born 1947), American politician
 Hubertus van Mook (1894–1965), Dutch administrator in the East Indies
 Mook (graffiti artist), American graffiti artist
 Robby Mook (born 1979), American political strategist
 Theodore Mook (born 1953), American cellist
 Wim Mook (1932–2016), Dutch isotope physicist
 Worranit Thawornwong (born 1996), Thai actress better known as "Mook"

Other uses
 Mooks clothing company, an Australian streetwear brand

See also
 Muk (disambiguation)
 Massive open online course (MOOC), a higher education course